Helen Boyd (1969) is the pen name of Gail Kramer, the American author of two books about her relationship with her trans partner. Her partner is referred to in both books as "Betty Crow", though this is also a pseudonym.

Biography
Helen Boyd graduated Phi Beta Kappa from The City College of New York in 1995 with a degree in literature. She has been a guest speaker at trans conferences, including the IFGE, First Event, Fantasia Fair, Southern Comfort, the Chicago Be-All, and also at special events like Trans Issues Week at Yale University. Helen and Betty have spoken about LGBT marriage on PBS's In The Life. As of 2011, she is also a Lecturer of Gender and Freshman Studies at Lawrence University.

Boyd also runs the mHB Forums, a message board for the discussion of crossdressing- and transgender-related topics.

Bibliography

My Husband Betty

My Husband Betty (2003, Seal Press) is a non-fiction book by author Helen Boyd about crossdressers and their partners. It was nominated for a Lambda Literary Award.

Unlike many other books about the topic of crossdressing, it is written specifically from the partner's point of view by a partner and takes a distinctively feminist approach. Although the author's husband was a crossdresser at the time of publication, she now considers herself "trans", a word chosen specifically because it was less well defined (and therefore less restrictive) than "transgender".

She's Not The Man I Married
Boyd's second book is She's Not the Man I Married: My Life with a Transgender Husband (Seal Press, 2007).

See also
 List of transgender-related topics
 List of transgender publications

References

External links
(en)Gender: Author's weblog
 Helen Boyd Books

1969 births
Living people
American memoirists
American women memoirists
American LGBT writers
Lawrence University faculty
American biographers
American women academics
21st-century American women